Jessie Mackaye was a comic stage actress of the Victorian era. Prior to becoming an actress she spent part of her youth in a convent in the United States. Mackaye is remembered for her role as "Micah Dow" in The Little Minister. The play was staged at the Olympia Theatre (New York) in September 1897.

Victorian actress
She was in the graduating class of the American Academy of Dramatic Arts in April 1896, held at the Lyceum Theatre (Broadway).

Mackaye began acting with the Amateur Comedy Club in a production of Dandy Dick, which was staged at the Lyceum Theatre in April 1896. She acted the role of "Sheba" at the entertainment venue at Seventh Avenue and 57th Street.
In January 1900 Mackaye teamed with DeWolf Hopper in The Mystical Miss (aka The Charlatan) in London, England.

References

External links
Jessie Mackaye photo with Maude Adams at Global Performing Arts Database, 9/27/1897

19th-century American actresses
American stage actresses
American women comedians
Year of birth missing
Year of death missing
American Academy of Dramatic Arts alumni